Bowman, Arkansas may refer to:
Bowman, Chicot County, Arkansas
Bowman, Craighead County, Arkansas